Rhombipoma rowleyana is a species of small sea snail with calcareous opercula, a marine gastropod mollusc in the family Colloniidae.

Description
The height of the shell reaches 3.2 mm.

Distribution

This marine species occurs off the Mermaid Shoals, Western Australia.

References

External links
 To World Register of Marine Species
 

Colloniidae
Gastropods described in 2012